Jakob Rosanes (also Jacob; 16 August 1842 – 6 January 1922) was a German mathematician who worked on algebraic geometry and invariant theory. He was also a chess master.

Rosanes studied at University of Berlin and the University of Breslau. He obtained his doctorate from Breslau (Wrocław) in 1865 and taught there for the rest of his working life. He became professor in 1876 and rector of the university during the years 1903–1904.

Rosanes made significant contributions in Cremona transformations.

Notable chess games 
 Jakob Rosanes vs Adolf Anderssen, Breslau 1862, Spanish Game: Berlin Defense. Rio Gambit Accepted (C67), 1-0 Sometimes, Rosanes was able to beat even one of the best masters of his time, Adolf Anderssen...  
 Jakob Rosanes vs Adolf Anderssen, Breslau, 1863, King's Gambit: Accepted. Kieseritzky Gambit Anderssen Defense (C39), 0-1 ...but as shows this beautiful game, the opposite result was probably quite usual in their games.

References

External links 
 
 

1842 births
1922 deaths
People from Brody
19th-century Austrian Jews
19th-century German mathematicians
20th-century German mathematicians
19th-century Polish mathematicians
20th-century Polish mathematicians
Jewish scientists
Algebraic geometers
Jewish chess players
Austrian chess players
Jews from Galicia (Eastern Europe)
19th-century chess players